Schradan, named after Gerhard Schrader, is an obsolete organophosphate insecticide. Schradan itself is a weak cholinesterase inhibitor and requires metabolic activation to become active.

See also
Dimefox
Mipafox

References

Acetylcholinesterase inhibitors
Organophosphate insecticides